Uzunark is a neighbourhood in the Pasinler District of Erzurum Province in Turkey.

References

Villages in Pasinler District